(boiled mate, or just cocido in Corrientes Province),  (mate tea), , or  (Cuyo, Argentina) is an infusion typical of Southern Cone cuisine (mostly consumed in Southern Brazil, the Bolivian Chaco, Argentina, Paraguay and Uruguay). It is traditionally prepared by boiling yerba mate in water, then strained and served in cups. It is a bitter tasting beverage, similar to mate but milder, with the same stimulating and nutritional properties. It is also sold in teabags, so it can be prepared like tea.

History 

The Jesuits in the current territories of the south of Brazil and Paraguay, and the Argentine provinces of Misiones and Corrientes, in the first decades of the 17th century improved the cultivation technique of the yerba mate and exported it. Spain, to compete with the tea that England sold, put a chopped yerba mate on sale to make tea that became popular in Europe, known as the "Tea of the Jesuits".

That "Tea of the Jesuits" from the 17th century, today has become the mate cocido, a very popular infusion that, because of the low price of yerba mate compared to the price of tea or coffee, has become since the early 20th century the common beverage in schools, hospitals and prisons.

Preparation 
The preparation of mate cocido in tea bags is almost the same as regular yerba mate, with the difference that in grinding the dust and sticks are removed, sorting and processing only the leaves. Mate cocido is also produced in soluble form.

Varieties 
 Traditional: made from yerba mate, sometimes consumed with milk and sweetened.
 Flavored: mate cocido to which an additional flavor has been applied. Some flavors are lemon, peach, vanilla, orange and tangerine.
 Iced mate cocido: also called "cold mate cocido". It is a highly refreshing drink, the traditional or flavored mate cocido served cold, usually adding ice and lemon juice.

See also

 List of hot beverages

References 

Herbal and fungal stimulants
Yerba mate drinks
Herbal tea
Hot drinks
Cold drinks
Latin American cuisine
Syrian cuisine
Tea culture
Argentine drinks
Brazilian drinks
Chilean drinks
Paraguayan drinks
Uruguayan drinks